Soin Medical Center is a full-service hospital located in Beavercreek, Ohio, United States, next to the Mall at Fairfield Commons. It is part of the Kettering Health network. The medical center is accredited by the American Osteopathic Association's Healthcare Facilities Accreditation Program.

History
Ground was broken on the hospital in November 2009, at a cost of $135 million. Soin Medical Center was built in response to Dayton, Ohio's rapidly growing suburbs and to serve some of its more profitable customers. It is the only hospital in a 10-mile radius which is home to more than 131,000 residents. The hospital was named after Indu and Raj Soin, philanthropists who have donated a large, undisclosed sum of money towards the project.

Soin Medical Center opened its doors on February 22, 2012. It features 80 beds and was designed for expansion up to 300. Current hospital services include emergency care, general surgery, orthopedic care, cardiac care, a birthing center, critical care, medical imaging and diagnostic services. The hospital is intended to serve the healthcare needs of nearby Wright Patterson Air Force Base and Wright State University, and to satisfy their anticipated population and development growth.

In July 2013 Soin Medical Center completed the addition of 31 beds to the hospital's fourth floor to meet the demand for surgical services.

See also

 List of Seventh-day Adventist hospitals
 List of hospitals in Ohio

References

External links 
 
 Kettering Health 

Hospital buildings completed in 2012
Hospitals in Dayton, Ohio
Buildings and structures in Greene County, Ohio
Beavercreek, Ohio
2012 establishments in Ohio
Kettering Health Network
Trauma centers